The following outline is provided as an overview, and topical guide to Denmark.

Denmark – country located in Scandinavia of Northern Europe.  It is the southernmost of the Nordic countries. The mainland is bordered to the south by Germany; Denmark is southwest of Sweden and south of Norway. Denmark borders both the Baltic and the North Sea. The country consists of a large peninsula, Jutland (Jylland) and many islands, most notably Zealand (Sjælland), Funen (Fyn), Lolland, Falster and Bornholm as well as hundreds of minor islands often referred to as the Danish Archipelago. Denmark has long controlled the approach to the Baltic Sea (in a concept known as dominium maris baltici), and these waters are also known as the Danish straits.

General reference
 Pronunciation: 
 English country name: Denmark
 Endonym: Danmark
 Adjectival(s): Danish
 Demonym(s): Dane(s)
 Etymology: Name of Denmark
 International rankings of Denmark
 ISO country codes: DK, DNK, 208
 ISO region codes: See ISO 3166-2:DK
 Internet country code top-level domain: .dk

Geography of Denmark 

Geography of Denmark

 Denmark is: a Nordic country
 Location:
 Northern Hemisphere and Eastern Hemisphere
 Eurasia
 Europe
 Northern Europe
 Scandinavia
 Time zone:  Central European Time (UTC+01), Central European Summer Time (UTC+02)
 Extreme points of Denmark
 High:  Møllehøj 
 Low:  Lammefjord 
 Land boundaries:   68 km
 Coastline:  7,314 km
 Population of Denmark: 5,564,219 (2011 estimate)  - 108th most populous country

 Area of Denmark: 43,098 km2
 Atlas of Denmark

Environment of Denmark

 Climate of Denmark
 Renewable energy in Denmark
 Geology of Denmark
 Protected areas of Denmark
 Biosphere reserves in Denmark
 National parks of Denmark
 Wildlife of Denmark
 Fauna of Denmark
 Birds of Denmark
 Mammals of Denmark

Natural geographic features of Denmark 
 Islands of Denmark
 Lakes of Denmark
 Rivers of Denmark
 World Heritage Sites in Denmark

Administrative divisions of Denmark 

Administrative divisions of Denmark

 Regions of Denmark
 Municipalities of Denmark

Regions 

Regions of Denmark

Municipalities 

Municipalities of Denmark
 Capital of Denmark: Copenhagen
 Cities of Denmark

Demography of Denmark
Demographics of Denmark

Politics of Denmark

Politics of Denmark
 Form of government: parliamentary, representative democratic, constitutional monarchy
 Capital of Denmark: Copenhagen
 Elections in Denmark
 Political parties in Denmark
 Taxation in Denmark

Executive branch

 Head of state (ceremonial): Queen of Denmark, Margrethe II
 Head of government: Prime Minister of Denmark
 Cabinet of Denmark

Legislative branch
 Folketing (unicameral)

Courts

Courts of Denmark
 Supreme Court of Denmark

Foreign relations of Denmark

Foreign relations of Denmark
 Diplomatic missions in Denmark
 Diplomatic missions of Denmark

International organization membership
Denmark is a member of:

African Development Bank Group (AfDB) (nonregional member)
Arctic Council
Asian Development Bank (ADB) (nonregional member)
Australia Group
Bank for International Settlements (BIS)
Council of Europe (CE)
Council of the Baltic Sea States (CBSS)
Euro-Atlantic Partnership Council (EAPC)
European Bank for Reconstruction and Development (EBRD)
European Investment Bank (EIB)
European Organization for Nuclear Research (CERN)
European Space Agency (ESA)
European Union (EU)
Food and Agriculture Organization (FAO)
Group of 9 (G9)
Inter-American Development Bank (IADB)
International Atomic Energy Agency (IAEA)
International Bank for Reconstruction and Development (IBRD)
International Chamber of Commerce (ICC)
International Civil Aviation Organization (ICAO)
International Criminal Court (ICCt)
International Criminal Police Organization (Interpol)
International Development Association (IDA)
International Federation of Red Cross and Red Crescent Societies (IFRCS)
International Finance Corporation (IFC)
International Fund for Agricultural Development (IFAD)
International Hydrographic Organization (IHO)
International Labour Organization (ILO)
International Maritime Organization (IMO)
International Mobile Satellite Organization (IMSO)
International Monetary Fund (IMF)
International Olympic Committee (IOC)
International Organization for Migration (IOM)
International Organization for Standardization (ISO)
International Red Cross and Red Crescent Movement (ICRM)
International Telecommunication Union (ITU)
International Telecommunications Satellite Organization (ITSO)

International Trade Union Confederation (ITUC)
Inter-Parliamentary Union (IPU)
Islamic Development Bank (IDB)
Multilateral Investment Guarantee Agency (MIGA)
Nordic Council (NC)
Nordic Investment Bank (NIB)
North Atlantic Treaty Organization (NATO)
Nuclear Energy Agency (NEA)
Nuclear Suppliers Group (NSG)
Organisation for Economic Co-operation and Development (OECD)
Organization for Security and Cooperation in Europe (OSCE)
Organisation for the Prohibition of Chemical Weapons (OPCW)
Organization of American States (OAS) (observer)
Paris Club
Permanent Court of Arbitration (PCA)
Schengen Convention
United Nations (UN)
United Nations Conference on Trade and Development (UNCTAD)
United Nations Educational, Scientific, and Cultural Organization (UNESCO)
United Nations High Commissioner for Refugees (UNHCR)
United Nations Industrial Development Organization (UNIDO)
United Nations Military Observer Group in India and Pakistan (UNMOGIP)
United Nations Mission in Liberia (UNMIL)
United Nations Mission in the Sudan (UNMIS)
United Nations Observer Mission in Georgia (UNOMIG)
United Nations Organization Mission in the Democratic Republic of the Congo (MONUC)
United Nations Relief and Works Agency for Palestine Refugees in the Near East (UNRWA)
United Nations Truce Supervision Organization (UNTSO)
Universal Postal Union (UPU)
Western European Union (WEU) (observer)
World Customs Organization (WCO)
World Federation of Trade Unions (WFTU)
World Health Organization (WHO)
World Intellectual Property Organization (WIPO)
World Meteorological Organization (WMO)
World Trade Organization (WTO)
World Veterans Federation
Zangger Committee (ZC)

Law and order in Denmark
Law of Denmark
 Capital punishment in Denmark
 Constitution of Denmark
 Crime in Denmark
 Human rights in Denmark
 LGBT rights in Denmark
 Freedom of religion in Denmark
 Law enforcement in Denmark

Military of Denmark
Danish Defence
 Command
 Commander-in-chief: Queen Margrethe II
 Ministry of Defence of Denmark
 Forces
 Royal Danish Army
 Royal Danish Navy
 Royal Danish Air Force
 Danish Home Guard
 Military history of Denmark
 Military ranks:
 Danish army ranks
 Danish air force ranks

Local government in Denmark

Local government in Denmark

History of Denmark

History of Denmark

 Military history of Denmark

Culture of Denmark
Culture of Denmark
 Architecture of Denmark
 Cuisine of Denmark
 Ethnic minorities in Denmark
 Festivals in Denmark
 Folk culture in Denmark
 Languages of Denmark
 Media in Denmark
 Museums in Denmark
 Coat of arms of Denmark
 Flag of Denmark
 National anthem of Denmark
 People of Denmark
 Prostitution in Denmark
 Public holidays in Denmark
 Records of Denmark
 Religion in Denmark
 Buddhism in Denmark
 Christianity in Denmark
 Church of Denmark
 Baptist Union of Denmark
 Catholic Church in Denmark
 Hinduism in Denmark
 Islam in Denmark
 Ahmadiyya in Denmark
 Judaism in Denmark
 World Heritage Sites in Denmark

Art in Denmark 
 Art in Denmark
 Cinema of Denmark
 Literature of Denmark
 Music of Denmark
 Television in Denmark
 Theatre in Denmark

Sports in Denmark
Sports in Denmark
 Football in Denmark
 Denmark at the Olympics

Economy and infrastructure of Denmark 
Economy of Denmark
 Economic rank, by nominal GDP (2010): 31st
 Agriculture in Denmark
 Banking in Denmark
 National Bank of Denmark
 Communications in Denmark
 Internet in Denmark
 Companies of Denmark
Currency of Denmark: Krone
ISO 4217: DKK
 Copenhagen Stock Exchange
 Energy in Denmark
 Energy policy of Denmark
 Oil industry in Denmark
 Health care in Denmark
 Mining in Denmark
 Tourism in Denmark
 Transport in Denmark
 Airports in Denmark
 Rail transport in Denmark
 Roads in Denmark
 Water supply and sanitation in Denmark

Education in Denmark
Education in Denmark
 List of schools in Denmark
 List of universities in Denmark

See also

Denmark

Index of Denmark-related articles
List of international rankings of Denmark
Member state of the European Union
Member state of the North Atlantic Treaty Organization
Member state of the United Nations
Outline of Europe
Outline of geography

References

External links

 Official Portal of Denmark
 Facts about Denmark and a brief tour through the country
 DanishHeritage.dk - Danish Heritage exists to protect and promote Denmark's spectacular historic environment and ensure that its past is researched and understood
 
 Encyclopædia Britannica's Denmark country page
 Google news Denmark
 History of Denmark: Primary Documents
 Krak printable mapsearch (outline of municipality visible but does not print out!) 
 Ministry of the Environment National Survey and Cadastre (Danish, English)
 Old Denmark in Cyberspace - Information about Denmark - the Danes
 Satellite image of Denmark at the NASA Earth Observatory
 Statistics Denmark Statistics free of charge
 Summary vital statistics about Denmark covering 1901 and forwards from Statistics Denmark
 Newest releases from Statistics Denmark (Danish, English)
 Various statistics from Statistics Denmark statistikbanken.dk

National symbols of Denmark
Denmark